Honggutan District is a district of Nanchang, the capital of Jiangxi Province, China. It covers over 175 square kilometers and  had a population of 600,000.

Administrative divisions
Honggutan District is divided into 2 subdistricts, 1 town and 3 management offices:

2 subdistricts
 Shajing
 Weidong

1 town
 Shengmi

3 management offices
 Fenghuang Zhou
 Hongjue Zhou
 Jiulong Hu

Metro
 Line 1 - Changjiang Road, Zhujiang Road, South Lushan Avenue, Lüyin Road, Weidong, Metro Central, Qiushui Square
 Line 2 - Metro Central, Cuiyuan Road, Xuefu Avenue East, Qianhu Avenue, Lingbei, Wolongshan, International Sports Center, Longgang, Nanchang West RS, South Square of West RS, International Expo Center, Yingtan Street, Civic Center, Jiulong Lake South, Shengmi, Dagang, Nanlu
 Line 5

References

External links
Nanchang Honggutan New District Government Web (Chinese)

Nanchang
County-level divisions of Jiangxi